Günter Bialas (19 July 1907 – 8 July 1995) was a German composer.

Life 
Bialas was born in Bielschowitz (today Bielszowice, a subdivision of Ruda Śląska) in Prussian Silesia. His father was the business manager of a German theatre, and his musical aesthetic was influenced by the personal experiences and connections he made while spending time at that theatre in his youth. The adolescent Bialas received lessons in piano and music theory from Fritz Lubrich, a former student of Max Reger, in Kattowitz (Katowice) between 1922 and 1925. After graduating from the German Minority-Gymnasium in Kattowitz in 1926, he studied musicology, Germanistics, and history at the Friedrich-Wilhelms-Universität zu Breslau from 1927 to 1931. He then proceeded to study music at the Prussian Academy of Arts in Berlin and subsequently taught at the Ursulines Girls' School in Breslau-Karlowitz from 1934 to 1937. He pursued further studies in composition with Max Trapp in Berlin. Through some of his Romanian friends, he made the acquaintance of Sergiu Celibidache and prepared for the entrance examination to the Berlin University of the Arts.

In 1939, he became a lecturer in music theory and composition at the Institute for Music Education at Breslau University. After his German military service and Allied captivity from 1941 to 1945, he and his wife, the singer Gerda Specht, had to flee Silesia. They settled in Bavaria in 1946 and Bialas found work conducting the Munich Bach-Verein. From 1947 to 1959, he taught composition at the Nordwestdeutschen Musikakademie, now the Hochschule für Musik Detmold. He transferred to become a professor at the State Academy of Music in Munich in 1959, where he remained until his retirement in 1972.

For his compositions, Bialas was recognized with many prizes and honors, including the Großer Preis für Musik des Landes NRW (1954), the Münchner Musikpreis (1962), the Johann-Wenzel-Stamitz-Preis (1964), the Musikpreis der Bayerische Akademie der Schönen Künste (1967, elected to the Akademie in 1971), the Plöner Musikpreis (1988), and the Bayerischer Maximiliansorden für Wissenschaft und Kunst (1991).

After his death in 1995, a street in his adopted hometown of Glonn was named Bialas-Straße in his honor and marked with a sign bearing his biographical details.

Bialas is considered to have been one of the most influential composition instructors in postwar Germany. The legacy of his open, liberal, and undoctrinaire attitudes to teaching may be appreciated in the stylistic variety of those who were his students or mentorees, including Nicolaus A. Huber, Peter Michael Hamel, Wilfried Hiller, Heinz Winbeck, Ulrich Stranz, Michael Denhoff, and Gerd Zacher.

Selected works
Opera
 Hero und Leander (premiered 1966, Mannheim)
 Die Geschichte von Aucassin und Nicolette (premiered 1969, Munich)
 Der Gestiefelte Kater (premiered 1976, Schlosstheater Schwetzingen)
 Aus der Matratzengruft (premiered 1992, Kiel)

Ballet
 Meyerbeer-Paraphrasen (premiered 1974, Hamburg)

Oratorio
 Im Anfang (1961), interpretation of Genesis based on text by Martin Buber, for three echoic voices, choir, and orchestra
 Lamento di Orlando (1983–85) for baritone, mixed choir, and orchestra

Cantata
 Indianische Kantate (1949), based on the composer's original poems, for baritone, chamber choir, 8 instruments, and drums
 Preisungen (1964), based on text by Martin Buber, for baritone and orchestra

Orchestra
 Romanzero (1955) 
 Seranata (1955) 
 Sinfonia Piccola (1960)
 Waldmusik (1977)
 Der Weg nach Eisenstadt (1980), fantasies on Haydn
 Marsch-Fantasie (1987)
 Ländler-Fantasie (1989)

Concertante
 Concerto Lirico (1967) for piano and orchestra
 Introitus - Exodus (1976) for organ and orchestra
 Music for Piano and Orchestra (1990)
 Cello Concerto No. 2 (1992)
 Trauermusik (Funeral Music) for viola and orchestra (1994)

Chamber music
 Music for Eleven Strings (1970)
 5 String Quartets (1935, 1949, 1968, 1986, 1991)
 Harp Quintet (1983)
 2 Saxophone Quartets (Six Bagatelles, 1986; Kunst des Kanons, 1991)
 Piano Trio (1981)
 Herbstzeit (1982) for string trio and piano
 Nine Bagatelles (1984) for wind trio, string trio, and piano
 Fünf Duette (5 Duets) for viola and cello (1988)

Piano
 Lamento, vier Intermezzi und Marsch (1986)

References

 Komponisten in Bayern, Band 5: Günter Bialas.  Verlag Schneider-Tutzing, 1984. .
 Kein Ton zuviel – Günter Bialas in Selbstzeugnissen und im Spiegel seiner Zeit.  Bärenreiter-Verlag, 1997. .
 Meyer, Gabriel E. Günter Bialas Werkverzeichnis. Bärenreiter-Verlag, 2003. .

External links 
 Biography and work list (Bärenreiter-Verlag)
Denhoff, Michael. "Günter Bialas zum 80. Geburtstag" ("Günter Bialas on his 80th birthday"; 1987).
 

1907 births
1995 deaths
People from the Province of Silesia
People from Ruda Śląska
20th-century classical composers
German classical composers
German classical pianists
Male classical pianists
German male conductors (music)
German music educators
University of Breslau alumni
Academic staff of the University of Breslau
German prisoners of war in World War II
Academic staff of the Hochschule für Musik Detmold
20th-century German conductors (music)
20th-century classical pianists
German male classical composers
20th-century German composers
German male pianists
20th-century German male musicians
German military personnel of World War II